The Dodge Intrepid is a full sized front-wheel drive four-door sedan that was produced by Dodge for model years 1993 to 2004. It is related to the Chrysler 300M, Chrysler Concorde, Chrysler LHS, Chrysler New Yorker, and Eagle Vision which were all built on Chrysler's new "cab forward" LH platform.

The Intrepid was sold in Canada as the Chrysler Intrepid.  In the United States, it replaced the Dodge Monaco as Dodge's largest passenger car.  With Dodge's introduction to Mexico during that time, it was badged as a Dodge, replacing the Dynasty which had been sold there under the Chrysler brand.

Background
The Intrepid's design goes back to 1986, when designer Kevin Verduyn completed the initial exterior design of a new aerodynamic concept sedan called Navajo. The design never passed the clay model stage. It was also at this time that the Chrysler Corporation purchased bankrupt Italian sports car manufacturer Lamborghini. The Navajo's exterior design was reworked and became the Lamborghini Portofino, released as a concept at the 1987 Frankfurt Auto Show. The Portofino was heralded as a design triumph, setting in motion Chrysler's decision to produce a production sedan with the Portofino's revolutionary exterior design, called "cab forward". The cab forward design was characterized by the long, low slung windshield, and relatively short overhangs. The wheels were effectively pushed to the corners of the car, creating a much larger passenger cabin than the contemporaries of the time.

Design of the chassis began in the late 1980s, after Chrysler had bought American Motors Corporation (AMC) in 1987. During this time, Chrysler began designing the replacement for the then-new Dodge Dynasty, which was a mid-size car. Initial proposals bore resemblance to the Dynasty, but this design approach was scrapped entirely in 1988 by François Castaing, the former AMC Vice President of product engineering and development. As AMC was purchased by Chrysler, Castaing became new Vice President for Vehicle Engineering for the new company. The acquiring automaker was in desperate need of replicating the AMC and Renault corporate culture where work was conducted in an atmosphere "of constant change". Castaing organized Chrysler's departments into AMC-style cross-function teams, as well as incorporated the use of simultaneous engineering. Moreover, the new vehicle's design, under Castaing's leadership, began with the Eagle Premier platform.

The Premier's longitudinal engine mounting layout was inherited, as was the front suspension geometry, and parts of the braking system. The chassis itself became a flexible architecture capable of supporting front or rear-wheel drive (designated "LH" and "LX" respectively). The chassis design was continually refined throughout the following years, as it underpinned more Chrysler prototypes: the 1989 Chrysler Millennium and 1990 Eagle Optima.The transmission was inspired by the Premier's Audi and ZF automatics. Borrowing heavily from Chrysler's A604 (41TE) "Ultradrive" transversely mounted automatic, it became the A606 (also known as 42LE).The initial standard 3.3 L pushrod V6 engine was joined in 1990 with a 3.5 L SOHC engine with four valves per cylinder. For the second generation Intrepid R/T the block was recast in aluminum as part of a comprehensive upgrade.

First generation (1993–1997)

The first generation of LH cars debuted at the 1992 North American International Auto Show in Detroit as three 1993 models: the Chrysler Concorde, Dodge Intrepid (badged as a Chrysler in Canada), and the Eagle Vision (also badged as a Chrysler in Europe).

The Intrepid was available in two trim levels: base and the sportier, better-equipped ES, which added four-wheel disc brakes, 16" wheels with better tires, and stiffer "touring" suspension damping. All Intrepids received driver and front passenger airbags, a rarity at the time, as well as air conditioning and the four-speed automatic transmission. Anti-lock brakes were optional, as was traction control and the more powerful 3.5 L SOHC engine rated at (214 hp).

The Intrepid's launch marked a new image for the Dodge brand, which began to market itself as "The New Dodge" with a marketing campaign featuring actor Edward Herrmann, who would go on to serve as the brand's spokesperson for the rest of the decade.

Changes were few over the Intrepid's initial five-year production. A new variable-assist power steering rack replaced the original for 1994, allowing for easier parking while maintaining a firmer feel at speed. The touring suspension tuning was also made standard equipment in the base model this year. Anti-lock brakes were made standard in the ES in 1995, and in 1996 a new manual shift function for the automatic transmission, called Autostick, was inherited from the Eagle Vision TSi: the first transmission of its kind available in a mainstream car. In addition, Chrysler updated the Dodge Intrepid for the 1995 model year, adding the previous Dodge Ram logo, which was used from 1994-2009. Each exterior treatment uses a hoodline and chrome accented daytime running lights with body colored accents. The Intrepid was often compared with the Chevrolet Lumina and Ford Taurus, and to a lesser extent, the Toyota Camry, Nissan Maxima, and Honda Accord.

Intrepids were built at American Motors' Brampton Assembly facility, originally established to manufacture the Eagle Premier, in Brampton, Ontario, Canada; and at the Chrysler plant at Newark, Delaware.

Engines
3.3 L OHV V6
3.5 L SOHC V6
Production Figures:

Second generation (1998–2004)

The LH cars were redesigned for the 1998 model year, with the 1998 Intrepid being designed by Robert Boniface and taking 31 months from design freeze to commencement. The engines were replaced by two new all-aluminum units: a DOHC 2.7 L ( 2736 cc),  V6 for base models, and a SOHC 3.2 L (3231 cc),  V6 for the ES. At the same time the 3.2 L was reduced to an option in the ES. The Intrepid was completely redesigned for the 1998 model year, arriving in showrooms during late 1997. Body shells were designed to be stronger and stiffer, as well as incorporating double-shear suspension mounts and integrated side impact protection.

 MY1999: Minor changes to interior panels. The Chrysler Sentry Key theft-deterrent system disabled the ignition unless the proper key was used to start the engine.
 MY2000: New variable-assist steering, and an optional 4-disc in-dash CD changer.
 MY2002: The 3.2L engine was discontinued, and new wheel covers became available.  the R/T received an extra  from PCM programming changes which allowed it to have  on 89-octane fuel. This was also the year when DaimlerChrysler began cost-cutting that led to the deletion of various features from the Intrepid. Most notable were the deletion of the illuminated headlight switch, illuminated traction control switch, illuminated lock and window switches, door courtesy lights (replaced with red reflectors), illuminated ashtray receptacle, trunk lid liner, armrest power outlet, door emblems, driver's seat map pocket, and the blacked-out front fascia paint scheme. Cost-cutting was one of the reasons why sales of the Intrepid started to slump.
 MY2003: No major changes were made except the optional 4-disc in-dash CD changer was replaced with the optional 6-disc in-dash CD changer. The R/T was discontinued in 2003, but a new SXT model kept the 3.5 L High Output engine with an increase to a  rating. The SXT moniker was eventually used across the Dodge product line as a trim level. The Intrepid SXT was basically a base model Intrepid SE with the 3.5 H.O. engine taken from the R/T, with some "sportier" features such as a sunroof and spoiler. It was a value trim model actually classified as an ES (SXT), but had less features than the ES did with a more powerful engine.
 MY2004: Popularity of the Intrepid waned over its 12-year lifespan. The cab-forward design, revolutionary in 1993, had become ubiquitous, culminating in the Intrepid's cancellation. All Intrepids were built at AMC's former assembly plant, originally used to manufacture the Eagle Premier, in Brampton, Ontario, Canada. They were replaced by the new rear wheel drive LX vehicles; the 2005 Dodge Magnum and 2006 Dodge Charger.

Fleet sales

The second generation was marketed to the commercial and government markets, particularly the base (1998-2000) and SE (2001-2004) trim levels. An Intrepid Police Package was sold from 2003-2004, similar to the earlier rear-wheel drive Chevrolet Caprice or Ford Crown Victoria. These packages had distinctive styling differences (such as small hub caps) and additional wiring to support strobes and flashers in the trunk compartment and in the front by the grill. The 3.5 V6 found in the R/T & SXT was standard in the police package. These packages and some non-police (non-commercial) packages featured plastic front-end intake vents that routed air onto the rotors for additional cooling and stopping power.

Engines
1997–2004 - 2.7 L V6 
1997–2001 - 3.2 L V6 
1999–2004 - 3.5 L V6 
1999–2001 - 3.5 L HO V6  
2001–2003 - 3.5 L HO V6  
2003–2004 - 3.5 L HO V6

Motorsport

In 2001, the Intrepid made its debut on the NASCAR circuit, signifying the return of Dodge to NASCAR competition after an 18-year hiatus. Drivers in the initial Dodge campaign included Bill Elliott, Kasey Kahne, Jason Leffler, Ward Burton, Sterling Marlin, John Andretti, Casey Mears, Jamie McMurray, Buckshot Jones, Kyle Petty, Stacy Compton, Dave Blaney, Jeremy Mayfield, and Casey Atwood. Marlin was the first to win in a Dodge, giving the marque its first victory since Neil Bonnett's 1977 win at Ontario. The Intrepid continued in NASCAR until 2005 when Dodge switched to the Charger.

Hybrid electric concepts

In the late 1990s, Chrysler used the Intrepid as a research platform for a hybrid electric vehicle in a diesel-electric configuration. Three variations were built, the Intrepid ESX, ESX II, and ESX III. The first vehicle was built in a series hybrid configuration, while the next two were considered mild hybrids. These were attempted in the time frame of 1997 to 1998.

The figure was impressive for such a vehicle. However, the car used a number of exotic materials, which made the cost excessive if it were ever to go into full-scale production. It was estimated that the car would cost $80,000, or roughly $60,000 more than a regular Intrepid. Part of this price increase was caused by the use of lead-acid batteries.

The vehicle was made much lighter than normal by using an aluminum frame and carbon fiber composite material. This version only cost around $37,000, or about $15,000 more than a standard Intrepid. This version used nickel metal hydride batteries.

It used less expensive materials, such as injection-molded thermoplastic instead of carbon fiber. The estimated cost was only about $7,500 more than a standard vehicle, which would give a total somewhere around $30,000. The ESX III used lithium ion batteries.

Trim levels
Base – 1993–2000
ES – 1993–2004
Motorsports Edition - 2001
SE – 2001–2004
Sport – 1995–1997
R/T – 1999–2002
SXT – 2002–2004
SST - 2002–2003

Awards
The Intrepid and Concorde were on Car and Driver magazine's Ten Best list for 1993 and 1994. The second-generation Intrepid again made the list for 1998 and 1999. Both generations won Consumer Guide's "Best Buy" award.

Oil sludge
Some second-generation 2.7 L V6 engines have suffered from failures due to oil sludge contamination. In February 2009, five separate class action lawsuits related to the alleged oil sludge defect were consolidated to the District of New Jersey. These problems happen when fine engine oil passages become clogged with sludge, and often result in catastrophic failure of the engine. An unknown number of Intrepid owners have been affected. Fixes include changing to synthetic oil, inspection, and even engine replacement. During the Chrysler bankruptcy proceedings, there was concern among consumer advocate groups that Chrysler's proposed "free and clear" sale of assets to "New Chrysler" would allow the automaker to avoid liability for the oil sludge defect.

References

External links

DodgeIntrepid.net - The Original Dodge Intrepid Forum
Chrysler Hybrid-Electric Cars of the 1990s: Dodge Intrepid ESX Accessed May 29, 2004.

Intrepid
Front-wheel-drive vehicles
Full-size vehicles
Sedans
Police vehicles
1990s cars
2000s cars
Cars introduced in 1992